Washington Conference may refer to:

Washington Peace Conference, a meeting of representatives of all states still in the Union in an attempt to avert the American Civil War, 1861. 
Washington Naval Conference, a meeting between representatives of nine nations with interests in the Pacific; November 1921 and February 1922.
 U.S.–British Staff Conference (ABC–1),  a series of secret discussions of American, British and Canadian (ABC) military coordination in the event of U.S. entry into World War II from January 29 to March 27, 1941    
First Washington Conference (code named ARCADIA), a meeting between U.S. President Franklin D. Roosevelt and British Prime Minister Winston Churchill from December, 1941, to January, 1942, to agree on war strategy.

Second Washington Conference, a meeting between Roosevelt and Churchill in June 1942 that prioritised North African landings.
Third Washington Conference (code named TRIDENT), a meeting between Roosevelt and Churchill in May 1943 to plan the Italian Campaign, the extent of military force, a date for invading Europe, and the war in Pacific.

See also
List of World War II conferences